Margaret Angus Patterson MBE (9 November 1922 – 25 July 2002) was a Scottish surgeon and medical missionary in India and Hong Kong. She claimed to be able to treat drug addiction using electric shocks, something she called "neuro-electric therapy" (NET). The reputation gained by NET was based on celebrity endorsements, but there is no evidence that it is an effective treatment.

Early life and education
Margaret Angus Ingram was born in Aberdeen, Scotland, in 1922. The daughter of Alexander Ingram, she was the youngest of five children. Patterson started medical school at 21 during World War II, and qualified as a member Fellowship of the Royal Colleges of Surgeons when she was 25, the only woman in the group.

Career 
Patterson went to India as a medical missionary. While in India she met George Patterson in Kalimpong and they married in 1953; the couple were committed Christians. George Patterson had become famous through his involvement with the Dalai Lama, and his reporting on the 1959 Tibetan uprising and the subsequent events in China's annexation of Tibet.   For her work establishing and expanding clinics in India she was awarded the MBE in 1961.

In 1964, she moved to Hong Kong with her husband, where she was appointed surgeon-in-charge at Tung Wah Hospital. They remained in Hong Kong until 1973.

In 1972, other doctors in Hong Kong, H.L. Wen and S.Y.C. Cheung, published their work on electroacupuncture for treatment of addiction. Patterson adopted their method, developing a technique called "neuro-electric therapy" (NET), replacing the acupuncture needles with electrodes, making this a form of cranial electrotherapy stimulation. On returning to the UK she and her husband collaborated to popularise the technique, which became popular with rock and pop stars.

The medical and scientific community was skeptical about the technique. Patterson found herself building clinics with minimal funding, much as she had in India.

In 1974, Patterson treated Eric Clapton for heroin addiction.

In 1976, Patterson set up a clinic in Broadhurst Manor, East Sussex, funded by the Robert Stigwood Organisation. Donors misleadingly marketed the clinic as "a cure for heroin addiction", which it was not. In 1981, funding ran out and she moved the clinic to California.

A 1986 article in New Scientist said that the medical establishment viewed Patterson as a quack for trying to remove addiction with tiny electrical currents, and that one clinical trial found it to be ineffective. People magazine said there was "disbelief and even hostility from Britain's medical establishment and from the US medical world".

Death and legacy
In 1999, Patterson had a major stroke a week after opening a clinic in Tijuana. In 2001, she and her husband returned to Scotland, where she died on 25 July 2002. She was survived by her husband, a daughter, two sons, and five grandchildren.

Her husband and one of her sons, Lorne, continued marketing the NET technique. As of 2012, evidence reviewed within NHS Scotland found no substantial evidence that neuro-electric therapy was helpful in treating opiate addiction.

Awards and honours
 MBE, 1961

See also
 Acupuncture
 Electrotherapy
 Quackery

References

1922 births
2002 deaths
Scottish Christian missionaries
20th-century Scottish medical doctors
20th-century Scottish inventors
Members of the Order of the British Empire
Fellows of the Royal College of Surgeons of Edinburgh
Scottish women medical doctors
Women surgeons
People from Aberdeen
Alumni of the University of Aberdeen
Scottish surgeons
Christian medical missionaries
Female Christian missionaries
20th-century women physicians
Women inventors
20th-century surgeons
20th-century Scottish women